Prepare Thyself to Deal With a Miracle is an album by jazz multi-instrumentalist Rahsaan Roland Kirk featuring performances by Kirk with Charles McGhee, Dick Griffin, Harry Smiles, Sanford Allen, Julien Barber, Selwart Clarke, Gayle Dixon, Al Brown, Kermit Moore, Rahn Burton, Henry Mattathias Pearson, Robert Shy, Sonny Brown, Ralph MacDonald, Dee Dee Bridgewater and Jeanne Lee.

Reception
The Allmusic review by Thom Jurek states "this is yet another criminally underappreciated Rahsaan Roland Kirk recording from the last phase of a remarkable career. This is perhaps Kirk's most experimental recording in that it involves his most involved performing on multiple horns and flutes — including his infamous and wonderful nose flute — and working with drones on a more surface level. Given Kirk's system of playing three horns at once, the drone horn was always a part of his sonic architecture. The difference here is that the melodic and improvisational lines take a back seat... There are numerous metaphors and metonyms here, but they will not come to the listener until later, when she or he regains the conscious notion of breathing".

Track listing
All compositions by Rahsaan Roland Kirk.
 "Salvation and Reminiscing" - 5:22  
 "Seasons: One Mind Winter/Summer/Ninth Ghost" - 9:37  
 "Celestial Blues" - 5:40  
 "Saxophone Concerto: Saxophone Miracle/One Breath Beyond/Dance of Revolution" - 21:00 
Recorded at Regent Sound Studios, NYC, January 22, 1973

Personnel
Roland Kirk: tenor saxophone, clarinet, flute, nose flute, black mystery pipes, alto saxophone
Charles McGhee: trumpet
Dick Griffin: trombone
Harry Smiles: oboe
Sanford Allen, Julien Barber, Selwart Clarke, Gayle Dixon: violin
Al Brown: viola
Kermit Moore: cello
Ron Burton: piano
Henry Mattathias Pearson: bass
Robert Shy: drums
Sonny Brown, Ralph MacDonald: percussion
Dee Dee Bridgewater, Jeanne Lee: vocals

References

1973 albums
Atlantic Records albums
Rahsaan Roland Kirk albums
Albums produced by Joel Dorn